James Oliphant Fraser Jr. (1858 – April 22, 1896) was a lawyer and politician in Newfoundland. He represented Fortune Bay in the Newfoundland House of Assembly as a Tory from 1893 to 1896.

The son of James Oliphant Fraser, who also represented Fortune Bay in the assembly, he was born in St. John's and was educated there. Fraser went on to study law, practised as a solicitor and then was called to the Newfoundland bar in 1888. He was also an agent for the Scottish Provident Institution and for the Dominion Safety Fund Life Association.

Fraser died in office in 1896.

References 

Members of the Newfoundland and Labrador House of Assembly
1858 births
1896 deaths
Newfoundland Colony people